The Havock class was a class of torpedo boat destroyer (TBD) of the British Royal Navy.

Background
The invention of the self-propelled torpedo by Robert Whitehead and Austrian Navy Captain Giovanni Luppis in 1866, combined with the introduction of small fast torpedo boats posed a threat to battleships: large numbers of torpedo boats could overwhelm a battleship's defences and sink it, or distract the battleship and make it vulnerable to opposing capital ships. Torpedo boats proved devastatingly effective in the 1891 Chilean Civil War.

The defence against torpedo boats was clear: small warships accompanying the fleet that could screen and protect it from attack by torpedo boats. Several European navies developed vessels variously known as torpedo boat "catchers", "hunters", and "destroyers"; while the Royal Navy itself operated torpedo gunboats.  However, the early designs lacked the range and speed to keep up with the fleet they were supposed to protect. In 1892, the Third Sea Lord, Rear Admiral Jackie Fisher ordered the development of a new type of ships equipped with the then novel water-tube boilers and quick-firing small calibre guns.

Orders
Six ships to the specifications circulated by the Admiralty were ordered initially, comprising three different designs each produced by a different shipbuilder:

Design

Havock was built with conventional locomotive boilers (giving her two closely spaced funnels) while Hornet was provided with 8 water tube boilers (giving her 4 widely spaced funnels). In other respects they were largely identical.

These boats all featured a turtleback (i.e. rounded) forecastle that was characteristic of early British TBDs. All six of them were removed from service and disposed of by the end of 1912, and thus were not affected by the Admiralty decision in 1913 to group all the surviving 27-knot and 30-knot destroyers (which had followed on these six 26-knot vessels) into four heterogeneous classes, labelled "A", "B", "C" and "D" classes.

The design of the Russian Russian Sokol-class destroyers was strongly influenced by the Havock-class.

Construction and trials
Havock was launched first, on 12 August 1893. Her sea trials on 28 October 1893 were successful, her top speed indicating that she was capable of keeping up with battleships. However, her bow torpedo tube proved to be useless as the ship would usually outrun her own torpedo. It also tended to cause the bows to dig into the sea, resulting in a very wet turtleback. As such it (and later, the turtleback) was absent in later destroyers.

Havock "behaved well" on trials. It was noted that Hornet "steers readily and well" but her coal consumption trial revealed that she used considerably more fuel than her sister.

Ships

Four other boats based on the Havock class, the Corrientes Class torpedo boat destroyers, were built for the Argentine Navy:

Royal Naval Service
Both ships served in home waters, although Hornet was briefly in the Mediterranean in 1909. Havock had her locomotive boilers replaced with water-tube boilers in 1899–1900, altering her appearance to a more standard 3-funnel arrangement.

Fate
Havock and Hornet did not survive to see World War I, being broken up in 1912 and 1909 respectively. With the exception of ARA Santa Fe (sunk 1897), three Argentine Corrientes Class boats served until 1930.

Notes

Citations

Bibliography

External links

 Havock and Hornet at battleships-cruisers.co.uk

Destroyer classes
 
Ship classes of the Royal Navy